Amanda Simper (born 2 February 1968 in Perth, Western Australia) is an Australian sprint canoer who competed in the early 2000s. At the 2000 Summer Olympics in Sydney, she was eliminated in the semifinals of the K-4 500 m event.

References

External links
 
 
 

1968 births
Living people
Australian female canoeists
Canoeists at the 2000 Summer Olympics
Olympic canoeists of Australia